Music for Dogs is the third studio album by American indie rock band Gardens & Villa. Released on August 21, 2015 by independent record label Secretly Canadian. The album was orchestrated with the help of visionary producer Jacob Portrait of Unknown Mortal Orchestra. The band hoped that Music for Dogs would maintain a wider scope than some of their other work by making it sound just as much like the futuristic music of tomorrow as it does the classic tunes of '76

Track listing

References

External links 
 http://www.secretlycanadian.com/artist.php?name=gardensvilla

2015 albums
Gardens & Villa albums
Secretly Canadian albums